Dara o Nadar is a 1999 Iranian film, written and directed by Fereidoun Hassanpour and produced by Taghi Aligholizadeh.

Plot 
Saeed is a teenage boy who urgently needs surgery due to heart disease on the advice of his doctor. Saeed's school friends, who are aware of his inability to pay for surgery, form a group called Sohrab. With the help of Khosrow (Akbar Abdi), the school caretaker, who is Sohrab's uncle, Saeed's friend, they decide to pay for Saeed's surgery by forming an orchestra to participate in the festivities, when suddenly all the money is stolen by someone. But with the help of the plan of one of the members of the group named Hamid, the children regained the money and Saeed's surgery was performed successfully.

Cast

Main cast 

 Akbar Abdi - as Khosro
 Ahmad Aghalu - as Nazem
 Mahmoud Basiri - as Aref
 Soroosh Khalili - as Tala Foroosh
 Fatemeh Sadeghi - as Marjan
 Soheil Peyghambari - as Soheil
 Afshin Sangchap
 Mehrdad Nozari
 Akbar Dudkar
 Sima Khezrabadi

nces

External links 

 
 

1990s Persian-language films
Iranian drama films
1999 films